The Maldives Development Alliance is a political party in the Maldives led by Ahmed Shiyam Mohamed.

History
The party was formed in 2012 by Ahmed Shiyam Mohamed. It was officially recognised by the People's Majlis on 21 October 2013, after it had gained three MPs; Mohamed, Ahmed Moosa and Ahmed Amir. It became part of a coalition with the Progressive Party of Maldives, supporting its candidate, Abdulla Yameen, in the presidential elections.

In the 2014 parliamentary elections it won five seats.

References

Political parties established in 2012
Islamic political parties in the Maldives
2012 establishments in the Maldives